Marsaxlokk Aquatic Sports Club is a waterpolo team from Marsaxlokk which competes in Malta.

For sponsorship reasons, the team is known as Marsaxlokk Browns.

The club also has a Swimming division and operates a restaurant.

Current squad
As at June 12, 2018:
 Ryan Coleiro
 C. Spiteri Debarro
 Luke Calleja
 Clyde Bonello
 Christian Gialanze
 Rainier Scerri
 Michael Rizzo
 Brian Buhagiar
 Stefano Luongo
 Matteo Cacici
 Joseph Galea
 Norbert Hosnyánszky
Head Coach: : Roman Polačík

References

External links
 Official Website

Water polo clubs in Malta
Marsaxlokk